The Victorian Midlands is an interim Australian bioregion located in central Victoria. The Victorian Midlands bioregion is part of the Southeast Australia temperate forests ecoregion.

Subregions
The Victorian Midlands bioregion consists of four subregions:

 Goldfields (VIM01) – 
 Central Victorian Uplands (VIM02) – 
 Greater Grampians (VIM03) – 
 Dundas Tablelands (VIM04) –

References

Biogeography of Victoria (Australia)
IBRA regions
Southeast Australia temperate forests